The third season of That '70s Show, an American television series, began October 3, 2000, and ended on May 22, 2001. It aired on Fox. The region 1 DVD was released on November 15, 2005. The majority of this season is set in 1977, although the year changed to 1978 for the final four episodes of the season.

Cast

Main 
Topher Grace as Eric Forman
Mila Kunis as Jackie Burkhart
Ashton Kutcher as Michael Kelso
Danny Masterson as Steven Hyde
Laura Prepon as Donna Pinciotti
Wilmer Valderrama as Fez
Debra Jo Rupp as Kitty Forman
Kurtwood Smith as Red Forman
Tanya Roberts as Midge Pinciotti
Don Stark as Bob Pinciotti
Lisa Robin Kelly as Laurie Forman

Special guest
Tommy Chong as Leo
Shirley Jones as Herself
Valerie Harper as Paula
John Ratzenberger as Glen

Special guest appearance
Howard Hesseman as Max

Special appearance
Charo as Herself
Robert Hays as Bud Hyde
Alice Cooper as Himself

Recurring
Allison Munn as Caroline

Guest
Jim Beaver as Tony
Curtis Armstrong as Barry Donavan
Danny Bonaduce as Ricky
Kevin McDonald as Pastor Dave
Nick Bakay as Donna's Journal
Joe Flaherty as Bryan
Dave Thomas as Chris
Ted Nugent as Himself
Monty Hall as Himself
Leslie Baker as Janitor

Episodes

Notes

References 

 That '70s Show Episode Guide at The New York Times

External links 
 
 

2000 American television seasons
2001 American television seasons
Television series set in 1977
Television series set in 1978
3